Tomlab is a German record label based in Köln.  It has released works by bands such as The Books, Casiotone for the Painfully Alone, Deerhoof, Thee Oh Sees, Les Georges Leningrad, and acts associated with Blocks Recording Club, such as Final Fantasy, Ninja High School, and The Hank Collective.

Artists

See also
 List of record labels

External links
Tomlab

German record labels
Alternative rock record labels
Indie rock record labels